The Auckland Warriors 2000 season was the Auckland Warriors 6th first-grade season. The club competed in Australasia's National Rugby League. The coach of the team was Mark Graham while John Simon was the club's captain.

Milestones
20 February - Round 3: Nigel Vagana played in his 50th match for the club.
1 April - Round 9: Joe Vagana played in his 100th match for the club.
8 April - Round 10: Lee Oudenryn played in his 50th match for the club.
6 May - Round 14: The Warriors lost 0–54 to the St. George Illawarra Dragons at WIN Stadium. This result stands as the Warriors largest defeat to date.
18 June - Round 20: Jerry Seuseu played in his 50th match for the club.
October–November: 20 players from the club participated in the World Cup: Stacey Jones, Ali Lauitiiti, Logan Swann, Joe Vagana, Nigel Vagana (New Zealand), Peter Lewis (Cook Islands), Talite Liava'a (Tonga), Monty Betham, Henry Fa'afili, Joe Galuvao, Vae Kololo, Francis Meli, Jerry Seuseu (Samoa), Terry Hermansson, Wairangi Koopu, Odell Manuel, Boycie Nelson, Henry Perenara, Clinton Toopi, Paul Whatuira (Aotearoa Māori).

Jersey & Sponsors

Fixtures 

The Warriors used Ericsson Stadium as their home ground in 2000, their only home ground since they entered the competition in 1995.

Pre-season trials

Regular season

Ladder

Squad 

Thirty four players were used by the Warriors in 2000, including seven players who made their first grade debut.

Staff
Chief executive Officer: Trevor McKewen

Coaching staff
Head coach: Mark Graham

Transfers

Gains

Mid-Season Gains

Losses

Other Teams
The Warriors had feeder agreements with the Newtown Jets in the NSWRL Premier League and Brisbane Souths in the Queensland Cup. Players not selected for the first grade side would be sent to one of these clubs for the weekend. This arrangement also worked the other way when the Warriors signed Jason Bell from the Jets midway through the season and the Brisbane Souths captain, David Mulhall, made his debut in Round 20. Occasionally players were also released to Bartercard Cup teams.

Awards
Robert Mears won the club's Player of the Year award.

References

External links
Warriors official site
2000 Warriors Season at rugbyleagueproject.org

New Zealand Warriors seasons
Auckland Warriors season
War